Atari System refers to two arcade system boards introduced in 1984 for use in various arcade games from Atari Games. Two versions of the board were released, Atari System 1 and Atari System 2.

Atari System 1

The Atari System 1 was Atari Games' first upgradeable arcade game hardware platform.  Introduced in 1984, the System 1 platform was used for the following games:
Marble Madness (1984)
Peter Pack Rat (1985)
Road Runner (1985)
Indiana Jones and the Temple of Doom (1985)
RoadBlasters (1987)
Relief Pitcher (unreleased prototype) - Atari Games released a different game titled Relief Pitcher in 1992 which used completely different hardware.

The hardware used a large circuit board with a Motorola 68010 main CPU running at 7.159 MHz, a MOS Technology 6502 sound CPU running at 1.789 MHz, a system ROM, text and graphics display hardware, and control interfaces.  Two large edge-card connectors allowed a "cartridge board" to be plugged in; the cartridge board supplied the main program ROMs, sound program ROMs, graphics ROMs, graphics shift registers, a "SLAPSTIC" copy protection chip, a Yamaha YM2151 FM sound generator, a POKEY and (for some games) TI TMS5220 LPC speech synthesis chip. System 1 was capable of generating a max resolution of 336 x 240 with 256 colors from a palette of 1024 colors.

Converting one System 1 game into another generally required replacing the cartridge board, attraction marquee, control panel, and in some cases installing additional controls (e.g., foot pedal for Road Blasters). Several games (most notably Gauntlet and Gauntlet II) used hardware that was electrically very similar to System 1, but implemented on a single board rather than using a cartridge board. Early System 1 boards and cartridge boards used large numbers of 7400 series TTL chips.  These boards were later replaced by the functionally identical "System 1 LSI Main" and "LSI Cartridge" boards, which used ASICs for reduced manufacturing costs. Modular or upgradeable video games were not commonly offered by the major video game companies in the 1970s and 1980s, because it was more profitable to sell an entirely new machine. System 1 and the Japanese JAMMA wiring standard were attempts to move to a modular solution, though there were many smaller companies that sold conversion kits for competitors' hardware.

Atari System 2

Very soon after the introduction of the Atari System 1, the Atari System 2 was introduced. The System 2 platform was used for the following games:
Paperboy (1985)
720° (1986)
Super Sprint (1986)
Championship Sprint (1986)
APB : All Points Bulletin (1987)
Accelerator (unreleased prototype)
Gremlins (unreleased prototype)

Probably the most noticeable difference between the System 2 and System 1 games was the fact that the System 2 used higher-resolution graphics. The video resolution was 512x384 and as such a medium-resolution monitor was used.The hardware was similar to its predecessor in the fact that it used two main circuit boards. In this case it used a "CPU board" and a "Video Board". The EPROMs were split between both boards. The main CPU was a Digital Equipment Corporation (DEC) T-11 microprocessor running at 10 MHz. The sound CPU was a MOS Technology 6502 running at 1.789 MHz, and the sound chips used were a Yamaha YM2151 running at approx. 3.579 MHz, 2 POKEYs at approx. 1.789 MHz and a TMS5220 running at 625 kHz.

External links
  

 System 16 - The Arcade Museum - Atari System 1 Hardware
 System 16 - The Arcade Museum - Atari System 2 Hardware
 Atari System 1 driver code in MAME
 Atari System 2 driver code in MAME
 The code t11 here is an example that emulates the DEC CPU within the MAME program.

Arcade system boards
Atari arcade games
68k-based arcade system boards